Tony Gowans is a former association football player who represented New Zealand at international level.

Gowans played three official A-international matches for New Zealand in 1967 at the Vietnam National Day Soccer Tournament: a 3–5 loss to Australia on 5 November 1967, a 3–1 win over Singapore on 8 November and a 1–5 loss to South Vietnam on 10 November 1967.

References 

Year of birth missing (living people)
Living people
New Zealand association footballers
New Zealand international footballers
Association footballers not categorized by position